Dubiraphia browni is a species in the family Elmidae ("riffle beetles"), in the order Coleoptera ("beetles").
Dubiraphia browni is found in North America.

References

Further reading
 American Beetles, Volume II: Polyphaga: Scarabaeoidea through Curculionoidea, Arnett, R.H. Jr., M. C. Thomas, P. E. Skelley and J. H. Frank. (eds.). 2002. CRC Press LLC, Boca Raton, Florida.
 
 Brown, Harley P. (1983). "A catalog of the Coleoptera of America North of Mexico, Family: Elmidae". United States Department of Agriculture, Agriculture Handbook, no. 529-50, x + 23 + i.
 Hilsenhoff, W. L. (1973). "Notes on Dubiraphia with descriptions of five new species". Annals of the Entomological Society of America, vol. 46, no. 1, 55–61.
 Peterson Field Guides: Beetles, Richard E. White. 1983. Houghton Mifflin Company.
 Poole, Robert W., and Patricia Gentili, eds. (1996). "Coleoptera". Nomina Insecta Nearctica: A Check List of the Insects of North America, vol. 1: Coleoptera, Strepsiptera, 41-820.

Elmidae